Archibald G. Rigg (April 5, 1878 – February 18, 1959) was a Canadian-born American architect. Over the course of his career, he designed hundreds of buildings in the Northwestern United States.

Early life
Archibald G. Rigg was born on April 5, 1878, in Stratford, Ontario, Canada. His father, William Rigg, emigrated from Scotland and his mother, Arabella Harvey, from England.

Rigg graduated from the University of Toronto's Trinity College and Columbia University.

Career
Rigg began his career as an architect in Danville, Illinois. He subsequently designed residential and commercial buildings in Spokane, Washington and Edmonton, Canada with another Canadian architect, Arthur W. Cowley. Rigg designed the NRHP-listed Salvation Army Building in Spokane in 1921.

With Roland Vantyne, Rigg designed many buildings in Spokane and Tacoma. They also designed the First Presbyterian Church in Whitefish, Montana, which is listed on the National Register of Historic Places (NRHP).

Rigg designed two buildings on the campus of Washington State University: Abelson Hall with Vantyne in 1935, and Engineering Laboratory Building in 1942.

Over the course of his career, "Rigg designed hundreds of buildings in a wide range of architectural styles spanning from the Revival period of the teens and twenties and into the post WWII era."

Works
Works include:
First Presbyterian Church (1921) in Whitefish, Montana, NRHP-listed
Salvation Army Building (1921), 245 W. Main Ave., Spokane, Washington, NRHP-listed
Abelson Hall (1935), Washington State University (with Vantyne)
Engineering Laboratory Building (1942), Washington State University

Personal life and death
Rigg was married to Mayme Ethel Beck. They resided in Spokane, and they had a daughter. Rigg was a Freemason. He died on February 18, 1959, in Spokane.

References

1878 births
1959 deaths
Canadian people of Scottish descent
Canadian people of English descent
People from Stratford, Ontario
People from Spokane, Washington
Canadian emigrants to the United States
Trinity College (Canada) alumni
Columbia University alumni
Architects from Washington (state)
20th-century Canadian architects
20th-century American architects
American Freemasons